Opie Taylor is a fictional character played by Ron Howard in the American television program The Andy Griffith Show, which was televised on CBS from October 3, 1960, to April 1, 1968. Opie Taylor appeared in 209 of the 249 episodes of The Andy Griffith Show, and appeared in 2 spin-off shows and a TV Movie.

There are two explanations of the origin of the character's name. One is that Opie was named after bandleader and radio actor Opie Cates; the other is that he was named for Opie Shelton (1915–1999), a childhood friend of Griffith, who went on to become president of the Atlanta Chamber of Commerce.

First appearance
Opie first appears in the February 1960 backdoor pilot of The Danny Thomas Show. Ron Howard was 5 years old at the time.

"The New Housekeeper"
In the first episode of The Andy Griffith Show (October 1960), Andy's Aunt Bee returns to Mayberry via Morgantown, West Virginia, at her nephew's invitation in order to manage the Taylor household after Andy's housekeeper Rose marries and departs. Although Opie, 6, secretly enjoys Aunt Bee's cooking, he otherwise dislikes her due to his grief over losing his beloved Rose. After discovering that she can neither play baseball nor fish, Opie declares that he will never love Aunt Bee. The final straw comes when she accidentally lets his pet bird escape, though it reappears at the end of the episode (the bird is  never again mentioned). A disheartened Aunt Bee chooses to leave. However, in a surge of empathy, Opie begs his father to let her stay; he fears for her well-being as she does not know how to do anything on her own.

Father/son

Opie's relationship with his "pa", Andy, provided plot material for many episodes. In one episode ("Opie the Birdman", September 30, 1963), Andy teaches Opie the value of responsibility and parenthood after Opie accidentally kills a mother bird with his slingshot and leaves her three nestlings orphaned. Andy, underscoring the consequences of Opie's carelessness, opens the boy's bedroom window so he will hear the chicks calling after the mother who will never come home. Naming the birds "Wynken, Blynken, and Nod", Opie nurtures them until they are ready to be released into the wild.

In another story, Opie finds a wallet containing $50 and gets to keep it when nobody claims it. A day later, Opie meets the man who lost it. The man later tells Andy (who was reimbursing the $50 after he found an ad describing the wallet in the paper) that he met Opie at the courthouse and told him about the wallet. Andy naturally assumes that Opie spent all the money and confronts his son. Opie tells his father that he decided to give back the $50, since he realizes that he could not be happy keeping the money because it was not truly 'his' to spend.

When not visiting his father at the courthouse, Opie would sometimes get into jams. Some of his juvenile misdeeds include: trespassing in a neighbor's barn, selling Miracle Salve to the citizens of Mayberry; accidentally destroying Aunt Bee's prize rose; concealing an abandoned baby in his clubhouse; tricking Goober Pyle into thinking a shaggy dog can speak, and starting his own tell-all community newspaper.

Much of the humor in the Andy/Opie relationship comes not from Opie being portrayed as a typical mischievous child, but from the respect he has for Andy. For all his boyish misgivings, Opie is always honest and truthful with his father, sometimes to his own detriment.  In one episode, Opie describes a utility worker he calls Mr. McBeevee he met in the woods.  Andy thinks it is an imaginary friend and tries to convince Opie of it, but, Mr. McBeevee is real and Opie maintains his story despite facing certain discipline from Andy.  In another episode, a runaway boy tells Opie not to disclose his whereabouts.  Having previously learned the value of confidentiality from Andy, Opie refuses to tell his father where the boy is rather than lie, or break a confidence, much to Andy's chagrin.

Appearances and mentions in other TV shows
When Opie is "almost 12" he runs away from Mayberry and flies to California to see Gomer Pyle and join the Marines in a 1966 episode of Gomer Pyle, U.S.M.C..

In the backdoor pilot episode from The Danny Thomas Show, viewers learn Andy lost Opie's mother when the boy was "the least little speck of a baby". Andy was referred to as a widower several times in the show which confirms that, indeed,  Opie's mother died. On a Mayberry RFD episode, viewers learn that Opie's former teacher and stepmother Helen gave birth to  Andy Taylor, Jr, who is christened in Mayberry.

Reunion telemovie (1986)

In the 1986 made-for-TV reunion movie Return to Mayberry, Ron Howard reprised his role as a now-adult Opie, who has become a newspaper writer. The plot was driven by his father's return to see Opie's wife give birth to their first child. Half-brother Andy Jr. does not appear nor was he mentioned.

Notes

References

Bibliography
 The Andy Griffith Show: Complete Series Collection. Paramount, 2007..
 Beck, Ken. The Andy Griffith Show Book. St. Martin's Griffin.

The Andy Griffith Show characters
Fictional characters from North Carolina
Child characters in television
Television characters introduced in 1960